Matka is a village in Lüganuse Parish, Ida-Viru County, Estonia.

References

Villages in Ida-Viru County
Lüganuse Parish